The Toa Payoh Swimming Complex is public swimming pool managed by Sport Singapore in Toa Payoh, Singapore. It is located at 301 Lorong 6 Toa Payoh.

Together with the Toa Payoh Sports Hall, the Swimming Complex is one of many public swimming complexes operated by the Sport Singapore. The swimming complex itself consists of five pools, of which three are meant for public use (a wading pool, a teaching pool and a training pool) while the other two in a separate section of the complex are used extensively for elite training by the national teams in the sports of water polo, synchronised swimming and diving.

Toa Payoh Swimming Complex is within walking distance from Toa Payoh MRT station.

Events 
Toa Payoh Swimming Complex has played host to the National Schools’ Swimming Championships for many years and, since March 2006, has been hosting the synchronised swimming event of the Asian Swimming Championships.

Most notably, the Toa Payoh Swimming Complex was the venue for the aquatics (diving) event for the inaugural Summer Youth Olympic Games that took place in Singapore in 2010.

References 

Sports venues in Singapore
Swimming venues
Venues of the 2010 Summer Youth Olympics
Youth Olympic diving venues